Che Puan Sofie Louise Johansson Petra (born 6 June 1986) is  the wife of Tengku Muhammad Fa-iz Petra ibni Almarhum Sultan Ismail Petra, the Crown Prince of Malaysian State of Kelantan.

Personal life
Johansson was born and raised in Linköping, Sweden. She graduated in English and Sociology Studies.

She moved to the United Kingdom to work as an au pair.

Marriage
Johansson married Crown Prince Tengku Muhammad Fa-iz Petra on 19 April 2019 at Istana Balai Besar, Kota Bharu, Kelantan.

Royal title
As a commoner who became consort to a Crown Prince, she was granted the title of Che Puan (glossed as "Lady"). On 2 August 2022, she was appointed as the Che Puan Mahkota of Kelantan (equivalent to the Crown Princess) by her brother-in-law, Sultan Muhammad V.

Honour 
 :
  Knight Grand Commander (SPMK) of the Order of the Crown of Kelantan (Al-Muhammadi Star) - Dato' (2022)

References

External links

1986 births
Living people
Royal House of Kelantan
People from Linköping
Converts to Islam
Malaysian Muslims
Swedish Muslims
Swedish expatriates in the United Kingdom
Swedish expatriates in Malaysia
Au pairs